"The Big Fix" is the second episode of the twenty-fifth season of the American animated television series South Park. The 313th episode overall of the series, it premiered on Comedy Central in the United States on February 9, 2022. This episode retconned the name of the supporting character Token Black, establishing that his name is really  Black, and that he was named after The Lord of the Rings author J. R. R. Tolkien.

Plot
Cannabis farmer Randy Marsh attends an exposition where he learns that some people are boycotting farms that are not employing people of color. Randy speaks with his wife, Sharon, and their children, Shelly and Stan, about their lack of interaction with black people, in particular the fact that Stan never plays with his black classmate, Token Black. Stan invites Token and his parents, Steve and Linda Black, to the farm for dinner. During dinner, it is revealed that Token's first name is actually , in honor of J. R. R. Tolkien. This comes to the surprise of Stan, who learns that he was the only one in his class who did not know this. Steve accepts Randy's invitation to provide financial consulting for his cannabis business, Tegridy Farms, but is later angered to see a Tegridy Farms billboard using his likeness. When Randy gives Steve some of the profits resulting from the new ad campaign, he realizes he is being commodified, and that Randy is not interested in any of his ideas. He leaves the business.

Stan goes to a doctor, fearing that he is racist, having thought Tolkien's first name was a reference to tokenism. The doctor harshly criticizes Stan for having assumed such a thing, and breaks the fourth wall to question whether "anyone else" believed the same thing. He suggests Stan do some reading from the perspective of a black person, but Stan instead reads books by J. R. R. Tolkien. In class, Stan shares what he learned from Tolkien's work and suggests it be made required reading. He later addresses a school assembly declaring it to be J. R. R. Tolkien Appreciation Day, but when he invites Tolkien up to speak, Tolkien declares that he hates Tolkien's work, and the fact that he was named after him. Later at Stan's house, Stan confesses to Tolkien his error regarding Tolkien's name. Tolkien says his parents bought the cannabis farm across the road, and named it Credigree Weed. Randy is incensed by this, and by the fact that Steve is using Randy's idea of exploiting Black culture for profit, and speaking in African-American Vernacular English to establish "street cred" with customers. Randy kicks Tolkien out of his house, promising to go to war with Steve. The episode ends with a gag public service announcement by the doctor, directed to those who thought Tolkien's name was really Token.

Reception
Dan Caffrey with The A.V. Club gave the episode an "A" rating, praising the Tolkien theme of the episode, and stating, "Of all the outstanding Tolkien episodes throughout South Park's history, I'd be hard-pressed to find one as funny and insightful as tonight's 'The Big Fix,' in which fantasy mythology and weed-farming come together to take on the hefty task of satirizing performative allyship."

John Schwarz with Bubbleblabber rated the episode an 8 out of 10, commenting on South Park's history of racial discussion, stating "'With Apologies to Jesse Jackson' kind of introduced Matt Stone and Trey Parker's misconceived notions from white people as it pertains to black culture, 'The Big Fix' focuses on them just a bit more. It's an interesting conversation, however, it's interesting that we really didn't get a firm grasp on what the 'apology tour' should be, and perhaps, maybe even Matt and Trey are wrestling with this as well."

References

External links
 "The Big Fix" Full Episode at South Park Studios
 

J. R. R. Tolkien
South Park (season 25) episodes
Television episodes about racism
American television episodes about cannabis